Scott T. Milner is an American chemical engineer, currently the Joyce Chair and Professor of Chemical Engineering at Pennsylvania State University and also a published author, being widely cited and widely held in libraries.

References

Year of birth missing (living people)
Living people
American chemical engineers
Pennsylvania State University faculty